The Minister in Charge of Tourist Activities and Immigration was a ministry in the government of New South Wales, responsible for promoting New South Wales as a place to visit and encouraging migration through its offices in London, and for the management of government-owned resorts. It was created in 1946 and abolished in 1950.

Role and responsibilities 
A government agency responsible for tourism and immigration was first created in 1905, the Intelligence Department, whose duties were "designed to make the attractions and possibilities of the State better known at home and a abroad, and to promote settlement on the land and to encourage immigration". It was renamed the Immigration and Tourist Bureau in 1908. In 1919 the bureau was divided into two separate agencies, with immigration becoming the responsibility of the Minister for Labour and Industry while the Tourist Bureau was the responsibility of the Chief Secretary. In 1938 Management of the Tourist Bureau was transferred to the Department of Railways. The responsibilities of the Tourist Bureau were managing the tourist resorts at Jenolan Caves, Jenolan Caves House, Abercrombie Caves, Yarrangobilly Caves, Wombeyan Caves and Hotel Kosciusko. The also conducted tours and published promotional material on NSW tourist attractions.

The elevation of tourist activities to a ministerial level was controversial. The Premier William McKell stated that there was a need for a Minister to devote himself to these matters and that "It is becoming increasingly, recognised, not only here but throughout the world, that we have much to offer the tourist, but to take full advantage of our opportunities we must take active steps to organise the trade and provide the facilities required". The Sydney Morning Herald criticised the unnecessary cost of the portfolio, stating there was no justification for the new office as immigration was a commonwealth matter and the political sphere was the worst way to develop tourist activities. 

The portfolio was abolished in the third McGirr ministry, with a new portfolio of immigration, while tourism ceased to be represented at a ministerial level until the fourth Cahill ministry in 1959.

List of ministers

Notes

References 

Housing
New South Wales